Alastair Lyon (born 1979) is a South African rugby union player. A prop forward, he has played at Newport Gwent Dragons, Border Bulldogs, Bedford Blues and currently plays semi-professionally for Richmond

He currently resides in the United Kingdom.

References

External links

South African rugby union players
Dragons RFC players
1979 births
Living people
Rugby union props
Rugby union players from the Free State (province)